Villa La Belle Époque is a historic mansion in Nice, Alpes-Maritimes, France. It was built from 1909 to 1911 for Mr Enos. It was designed by architect Jean-Baptiste Blanchi, with additional gilded decorations designed by Michel de Tarnowski. It has been listed as an official national monument since October 23, 1992.

References

Houses completed in 1911
Monuments historiques of Nice
20th-century architecture in France